Sunny is a 2011 South Korean comedy-drama film. The film is about a middle-aged woman who tries to fulfill her friend's dying wish of reuniting their group of high school friends. The film alternates between two timelines: the present day where the women are middle-aged, and the 1980s when they were in high school. It is the second film by writer-director Kang Hyeong-cheol, who previously directed Scandal Makers (2008).

Released on 4 May 2011, Sunny was the first film of that year to sell five million tickets in South Korea, and became the second highest-grossing Korean film by the end of the year. , it is the 13th best-selling film of all-time in South Korea. Kang Hyeong-cheol and Nam Na-yeong won Best Director and Best Editing, respectively, at the Grand Bell Awards. Actress Kang So-ra won several awards for her role as the teenage girl Ha Chun-hwa.

Plot

Im Na-mi (Yoo Ho-jeong), a wealthy housewife and mother, does her daily routine. While things look perfect on the outside (wonderful home, generous husband, beautiful daughter), she is depressed about her life. When she washes her face, she sees wrinkles on her skin. When she asks her husband to visit her mother at the hospital, he replies by giving her money to buy luxury bags, and her daughter expresses similar indifference and annoyance. Na-mi eats breakfast alone every morning while her husband and daughter head to work and school, respectively. She looks outside and notices a group of high school girls who are walking and laughing.

After visiting her mother, Na-mi passes a patient's room with the sign "Ha Chun-hwa," and thinks about her high school life. She asks her chauffeur to take her to the all-girls high school she attended in Seoul. A teenage Na-mi (Shim Eun-kyung) is revealed.
 
In class, the girls are dusting records and admiring posters of American actors. Many of the girls are wearing American athletic shoe brands. The teacher enters and introduces Na-mi. The students make fun of her country accent, and she becomes embarrassed of her shoes and clothing.
There, Na-mi meets Ha Chun-hwa (Kang So-ra), who introduces Na-mi to her group of friends: Kim Jang-mi (Kim Min-young) is a portly girl who is obsessed with her looks and desires cosmetic surgery for her eyes. Hwang Jin-hee (Park Jin-joo), the daughter of a Korean literature professor, swears profusely. Seo Geum-ok (Nam Bo-ra) is a bright student who wants to become a writer; she will hit anyone who messes with her friends. Ryu Bok-hee (Kim Bo-mi) has dreams of becoming Miss Korea; she carries a small hand mirror and makes faces to herself. Jung Su-ji (Min Hyo-rin) is a quiet, mysterious beauty; whenever she speaks to Na-mi, it is always with disdain. Na-mi is accepted into their group as their seventh member after she unexpectedly proves herself against a rival group from a different school when she uses her diabetes as a front for spirit possession. Chun-hwa suggests naming their group; they settle on "Sunny," after a night-time radio DJ responds to their letter on air. During this time Na-mi meets Han Joon-ho (Kim Shi-hoo), a friend of Jang mi's brother. She is instantly enamored with him. Throughout the movie, there are flashbacks of the time the two spent together as he becomes Na mi's first love.

Back at the present time, Na-mi returns to Chun-hwa's room and confirms it is indeed her high school friend. She learns that Chun-hwa (Jin Hee-kyung) became a successful businesswoman, but has terminal cancer with two months to live. Chun-hwa then tells her she would like to see Sunny reunited one more time before she dies.

Na-mi hires a private detective to find the members of Sunny. Jang-mi (Go Soo-hee) is struggling as a life insurance sales agent. The foul-mouthed Jin-hee (Hong Jin-hee) married rich, but her husband cheats, and she pretends to be ladylike. Geum-ok (Lee Yeon-kyung) is unemployed and living in a cramped apartment with her overbearing sister-in-law, her sister-in-law's husband, and a newborn. After her mother's salon went bankrupt, Bok-hee (Kim Sun-kyung) had resorted to prostitution; her daughter lives at an orphanage. The detective notes that Su-ji has been exceptionally difficult to find; he recommends posting a newspaper ad. Na-mi also asks the detectives to search for Joon-ho. Eventually, he is found and Na mi goes to visit him. While on her way to see him, she flashes back to the time the group of friends went on a trip together. While on the bus Na-mi draws a portrait of Joon-ho; she later goes in search of him with the intention of giving him the drawing. When she finds him, she is shocked to see him and Su-ji kiss. She leaves in tears and never gives him the picture. Now as an adult, she goes to the record shop Joon-ho owns and sees Joon-ho's son (who looks exactly like the younger Joon-ho). She then gives the now-older Joon-ho (Lee Geung-young) the drawing, and by doing so she is able to let go of her first love.

Chun-hwa passes away before the group manages to get together, but by finding each other, the women rekindle their passion for life and enjoy each other's company. At one point Chun-hwa, Na-mi, Jang-mi and Jin-hee get together to get revenge on the group of girls who are bullying Na-mi's daughter. At Chun-hwa's funeral, Sunny (minus Su-ji), is reunited, but not every woman knows about each other's present struggles. As they are about to leave, Chun-hwa's lawyer (Sung Ji-ru) walks in and asks them if they are Sunny. He reads Chun-hwa's will, which bequeathes that Na-mi will be the leader of Sunny. Jin-hee is given the position of vice-president; she looks disappointed because she expected something monetary. To that, the lawyer explains, "You are already rich" from Chun-hwa. He then reads that, for Jang-mi, Chun-hwa had bought life insurance from her, in the names of all the members of Sunny. Jang-mi is elated that she will finally be number one in her sales for that month. To Geum-ok, Chun-hwa offers her a position at her publishing company, with a chance to become executive manager if she doubles her sales. Chun-hwa leaves Bok-hee a paid-for apartment, so that she may live with her daughter. And after she finishes rehab, she will also receive the ground floor of Geum–ok's building, with a large sum of money, so she can open a hair salon.

After the conclusion of the reading, per Chun-hwa's last wish the women reprise their high school choreography by dancing to "Sunny" in front of Chun-hwa's funeral picture. As they celebrate, Su-ji (Yoon Jung) makes a surprise appearance. The film ends with flashbacks to their teenage selves.

Cast

Present
Yoo Ho-jeong as Im Na-mi
Jin Hee-kyung as Ha Chun-hwa
Go Soo-hee as Kim Jang-mi
Hong Jin-hee as Hwang Jin-hee
Lee Yeon-kyung as Seo Geum-ok
Kim Sun-kyung as Ryu Bok-hee
Yoon Jung as Jung Su-ji
Baek Jong-hak as Na-mi's husband
Ha Seung-ri as Ye-bin, Na-mi's daughter
Jung Suk-yong as Jong-ki, Na-mi's older brother 
Lee Jun-hyeok as Owner of private detective agency
Lee Geung-young as Han Joon-ho
Kim Shi-hoo as Joon-ho's son
Kim Ji-kyung as Jin-hee's husband
Joo-ho as Insurance company manager
Cha Tae-hyun as Model of insurance company
Kim Joon-ho as Private detective
Sung Ji-ru as Chun-hwa's lawyer

1980s
Shim Eun-kyung as Im Na-mi
Kang So-ra as Ha Chun-hwa
Kim Min-young as Kim Jang-mi
Park Jin-joo as Hwang Jin-hee
Nam Bo-ra as Seo Geum-ok
Kim Bo-mi as Ryu Bok-hee
Min Hyo-rin as Jung Su-ji
Kim Shi-hoo as Han Joon-ho
Kim Young-ok as Na-mi's grandmother
Jung Won-joong as Na-mi's father
Kim Hye-ok as Na-mi's mother
Park Young-seo as Jong-ki, Na-mi's older brother 
Chun Woo-hee as Sang-mi
Kim Ye-won as Leader of rival gang "Girls' Generation"
Ryu Hye-rin as Member of band "Girl's Generation"
So Hee-jung as Homeroom teacher
Kim Won-hae as Student liaison teacher
Park Hee-jung as Young-jin
Han Seung-hyun as Jang-mi's older brother
Kang Ji-won as Su-jin's stepmother
Kang Rae-yeon as Jong-ki's girlfriend
Yang Hee-kyung as Jang-mi's mother

Allusions
The flashback scenes juxtaposed the fun and silly, drama-filled lives of high school students with the Gwangju Uprising that took place in May 1980. In the film, Na-mi's brother is a university student who participates in the protests. The scenes where Sunny fights the rival gang are backgrounded with the violent clash between the protestors and the military.

The movie's release was timely with the entertainment industry's focus on 1980s musicals, films, and pop music. Western brands and products were abundantly present in the flashback portions of the film. The trendy high school students all wore Nike and Adidas. A billboard for Rocky was visible in the background of the fight between Sunny and their rivals. The music also referenced songs from the 1980s including "Touch by Touch" by Joy, "Girls Just Want to Have Fun" by Cyndi Lauper, "Reality" by Richard Sanderson, and Boney M.'s 1976 cover of Bobby Hebb's song "Sunny," as well as the Korean pop songs  "In My Dreams" by Jo Duk-bae and  "I See" by Nami. Especially the song use in the first and ending scene is "Time after time", sang by Tuck & Patti, original version of Cyndi Lauper.

Original soundtrack
The album is comprised by instrumentals composed by music director Kim Jun-seok that express the characters' emotional state. The film also featured a mix of 1980s Korean and Western pop music to evoke nostalgia, and to signify the Western "fad" that swept over students in Korea at the time.

Release
The film was released on 4 May 2011 in South Korea. It also received a limited release in the United States in July 2011, screening in Los Angeles, Torrance, New York City, New Jersey, Chicago, Virginia, Washington D.C., Seattle, Texas and Hawaii.

Film festivals
The film has been shown in film festivals worldwide:

Reception

Box office
In 2011, the movie sold 7,375,110 tickets, and grossed , making it the year's second highest grossing Korean film and fourth highest grossing overall film in South Korea. At the end of the movie's run, it had sold 7.38 million admissions, with an additional 90,555 from a director's cut.

Awards and nominations

Remakes 
Hong Kong television series Never Dance Alone, which aired on TVB in 2014, is reportedly inspired by this movie. The remake is not official.

A Hollywood remake of the movie was announced to be in production since 2016.

A Vietnamese remake of the movie, titled Tháng Năm Rực Rỡ (Go Go Sisters) was released on 9 March 2018. It topped the Southeast Asian country’s box office in its opening weekend (collected 490,000 views) and received overwhelming positive feedbacks from the media, movie reviewers, and public audiences.

A Japanese remake of the movie, titled Sunny: Our Hearts Beat Together (Sunny: Tsuyoi Kimochi Tsuyoi Ai, lit. Sunny: Strong Mind Strong Love) was released on 31 August 2018.

An Indonesian adaptation remake of the movie, titled Bebas (Glorious Days) was released on 3 October 2019.

Notes

References

External links
  
 Sunny at Naver 
 
 
 

2011 films
South Korean buddy films
2010s teen comedy-drama films
South Korean comedy-drama films
South Korean teen comedy-drama films
Films set in the 1980s
CJ Entertainment films
2010s Korean-language films
Films about cancer
Films about death
Films about friendship
Films directed by Kang Hyeong-cheol
2010s buddy comedy-drama films
2011 comedy films
2011 drama films
2010s South Korean films